Guillermo Hernandez, better known as Willie Hernandez, is a Filipino former amateur tennis player.

Hernandez, the son of a famous sportscaster, grew up in Manila and started playing tennis at the age of 10. His first international title was a junior tournament in Osaka. After briefly attending Hopkins High School in Minnesota as an exchange student, Hernandez played collegiate tennis for the University of Arizona. 

He won two medals with the Philippines at the 1962 Asian Games. 

Hernandez won the 1963 Arizona Open on clay against a field of U.S. clay players.

During the 1990s he relocated to the United States.

References

External links
 

Year of birth missing (living people)
Living people
Filipino male tennis players
Arizona Wildcats men's tennis players
Asian Games medalists in tennis
Asian Games silver medalists for the Philippines
Asian Games bronze medalists for the Philippines
Medalists at the 1962 Asian Games
Tennis players at the 1962 Asian Games
Sportspeople from Manila